Szajnocha is a Polish-language family name. It is a Polonized form of the ancestors' surname (Scheinoha), first used by Karol Szajnocha. The surname may refer to:

Karol Szajnocha (1818-1868), Polish writer, historian, and independence activist
Władysław Szajnocha (1857-1928), Polish geologist, and paleontologist

Polish-language surnames